The Casablanca Uprisings of 1952 were a violently repressed anti-colonial popular movement that took place 7-8 December 1952 in Casablanca, Morocco in response to the French assassination of the Tunisian labor unionist Farhat Hached in Tunis on 5 December. The  (UGSCM) labor union and the Istiqlal Party organized two days of strike and protests. Over 3,500 workers assembled in demonstrations that were violently dispersed by French police. Hundreds of Europeans rampaged into Moroccan neighborhoods leading to hundreds killed or wounded.

Street children and dock workers also participated in the Casablanca protests of December 1952.

Context 
The Tunisian labor unionist and anti-colonial activist Farhat Hached was assassinated by La Main Rouge, operated by the French Service de Documentation Extérieure et de Contre-Espionnage, in Tunis on 5 December 1952.

Carrières Centrales 
The protests were centered in the working class neighborhood  (now Hay Mohammadi)—then on the outskirts of Casablanca—a neighborhood populated partially by migrants from rural areas seeking employment in the city and partially by Moroccans displaced from the city center in 1938 when the French authorities used a typhoid epidemic as justification to destroy shantytowns near the European . Up until the early 1950s,  was a massive shantytown; the French authorities considered it a den of nationalist fervor and popular resistance and therefore a threat to the colonial order.

The slums at  became the first collective housing project made with Ecochard's 8x8 meter model, designed to address Casablanca's issues with overpopulation and rural exodus.

Aftermath 
Leaders of the Istiqlal party were arrested. The Judeo-Moroccan human rights activist and intellectual Abraham Serfaty was expelled from Morocco by the French regime for his involvement in the protests. In the aftermath of the riots, French authorities arrested Abbas Messaadi, who would eventually escape, found the Moroccan Liberation Army, and join the armed resistance in the Rif.

British-Pathé referred to the events as "communist riots."

References 

Casablanca
General strikes in Africa
Police brutality in Africa
Colonialism
1950s conflicts